Disco Not Disco 3, also known as Disco Not Disco: Post Punk, Electro & Leftfield Disco Classics 1974–1986, is the third and final compilation album from the Disco Not Disco series released by Strut Records in 2008. The album is a probe to experimental side of disco and punk genres and underground music scene in general. The second volume is more post-punk oriented and features artists like Yellow Magic Orchestra, Vivien Goldman, Delta 5, James White and The Blacks,  Maximum Joy, and others.

This last compilation album of the Disco Not Disco series was compiled by Last Night a DJ Saved My Life co-author Bill Brewster and Strut Records owner and founder Quinton Scott. 

The album contains a 1981 proto-techno track "Sharevari"  by A Number of Names.

Reception
The AllMusic review by Andy Kellman awarded the album 4  stars.
The Stylus Magazine review by Andy Battaglia gave the album 6.2 from 10 saying "The original impulse behind Disco Not Disco was monumental ... but that same monumentality eats away at the new third volume of the series, which arrives on the other side of a revolution whose most important battles have already been fought and won".

Track listing

Personnel

 
"Launderette"
Violin: Vicky Aspinall
Electric guitar, bass guitar: Keith Levene
Composer, vocals: Vivien Goldman
Composer: George Oban
Bass guitar, piano: Steve Beresford

"Mind Your Own Business"
Composer, vocals: Julz Sale
Composer, bass guitar, vocals: Bethan Peters, Rosalind Allen
Composer, electric guitar: Alan Riggs
Producer: Delta 5, Rob Warr

"My Spine Is the Bassline"
Producer: Shriekback

"Crunch Cake"
Electric guitar: Gary Boyle
Bass guitar: Dan K. Brown
Drums: Nigel Morris
Synthesizer, vocals, clavinet: Zoe Kronberger
Composer, piano, synthesizer: Frank Roberts
Producer: Robin Lumley

"Contort Yourself" (August Darnell Remix)
Remix: August Darnell
Electric guitar: Jody Harris
Bass guitar: George Scott
Drums: Don Christensen
Keyboards: Adele Bertei
Backing vocals: Anya Phillips
Saxophone, lead vocals, producer, arrangement: James White
Engineer: Bob Blank

 

"Love Tempo" (Remix)
Remix: Mark Kamins
Engineer: Stewart Pickering

"Seoul Music"
 
"Don't Lose Control"
Remix: John Luongo
Bongos: Daniel Ponce
Drums: Tony Thompson
Composer, bass guitar: Bill Laswell
Composer, synthesizer: Michael Beinhorn
Producer: Material

"Binary"
Producer: Yves Roze

"Los Niños Del Parque"  (12" Mix)
Producer: Beate Bartel, Chrislo Haas

"Sharevari"  (Instrumental)
Arrangement: Judson Powell, Robert Taylor

"Beat 'Em Right"
Electric guitar: Marty Williamson
Bass guitar, dub: Stephen Mallinder
Additional percussion: Andy Johnson
Producer: Cabaret Voltaire, Six Sed Red

"Silent Street / Silent Dub"
Producer – Dick O'Dell, John Walker, Pete Mayburn

References

2008 compilation albums
Post-punk compilation albums
Post-disco compilation albums